Kang Hyunkyung is a South Korean female  track cyclist. She won the bronze medal in the  team pursuit  at the 2016 Asian Cycling Championships.

References

Year of birth missing (living people)
Living people
South Korean track cyclists
South Korean female cyclists
Place of birth missing (living people)
21st-century South Korean women